The Shanghai Symphony Orchestra is a symphony orchestra in Shanghai, China. Its music director is Yu Long.

Founded in 1879, the SSO is the oldest Chinese symphony orchestra. Originally, it was known as the Shanghai Public Band, expanding in 1907 to an orchestra. In 1922, it was renamed as the Shanghai Municipal Council Symphony Orchestra.

History

1879
Shanghai Symphony Orchestra's predecessor was established known as the Shanghai Public Band.
French flautist Jean Rémusat was appointed as conductor. At the time he was deemed "the best European flautist and the chief flute soloist of the theaters in Paris and London" by the Shanghai-based North-China Herald.
Musicians were all Filipinos and audiences were Europeans from the concessions.

1907
German conductor Rudolf Buck succeeded as a conductor. He brought 8 musicians from Germany and Austria as chiefs of different sections. Authentic orchestral music performances began and its regulations became standardized, with regular summer and winter concert seasons established including the European coupon concert and stroll concert. The music played became more diverse; however, there were only 39 people in the band so songs performed were somewhat brief.

1919
Mario Paci, who was an Italian pianist, took over command. He reconstructed the band in accordance with the urban European orchestras. He went to Europe for recruitment of Italian musicians, including Arrigo Foa, who was a graduate of Milan Conservatory and became vice conductor later. Paci led the orchestra for a splendid 23 years, building it into "the best in the Far East".

1922
The band was renamed as Shanghai Municipal Council Symphony Orchestra. During the next 23 years of "Paci Era", the Orchestra played more different kind of music and had cooperation with famous musician from Europe and around the world.

1923
It was the first time that Chinese people appeared in the concert of the orchestra. Although the orchestra mainly served for foreigners from the concessions, Paci cared a lot about cultivating Chinese audiences and music talents. 5 years later, the summer open-air concerts were open to Chinese audiences for the first time. Later on, Chinese viewers made up 24% of the audience.

1942
The Japanese took over the orchestra and renamed it Shanghai Philharmonic Orchestra. Foa succeeded as conductor in May. During this special period, musical activities not only avoided suppression, but became more active than ever before. When World War II ended, it was taken over by the National Government and its name changed to Shanghai Municipal Orchestra. The European musicians left one after another, which provided Chinese musicians with opportunities. A time was evolving for Chinese people to master the orchestra and the music life of China.

1919–1948 
"Greatest Orchestra in the Far East".

1956
The Orchestra formally was known as the Shanghai Symphony Orchestra.

October 1950 
Yijun Huang appeared as a conductor on the symphony stage.

December 1984 
Conductor Xieyang Chen became the band leader. Under the leadership of Xieyang Chen, the orchestra embarked on large-scale reform. He established the SSO concert season, set up the institution of musical director, introduced a system of employment contracts, and founded China Symphony Development Foundation and Shanghai Symphony Lovers Society. He also initiated a global tour, bringing the orchestra to the global stage.

1986
The orchestra implemented the music director system. Xieyang Chen became the first director. Yu Long currently is the director.

15 April 2014

The SSO changed their logo. The new symbol of the Shanghai Symphony Orchestra originated from the relationship between music and human. The main body of the symbol is circular and represents harmonious and the spread of the sound. In the basic circular form, the use of cut-ins of the notes integrates these two elements. These open circles represent the Shanghai style.
Circles buckle and form two S’s and an O. They form an "SSO", which salutes the prior edition of the Shanghai Symphony Orchestra logo. In large, the whole logo is a combination of people, just like the band combination, which embodies the symphony as a whole formed by individuals. At the same time, it reflects the overall harmony and unity.
The new logo also has a sense of the waves, which has association of river and water. Nonetheless, this is the first characteristic of Shanghai, a metropolis of the west coast of the Pacific.

Major performances

The orchestra has participated in the China Art Festival, China Shanghai International Arts Festival, Shanghai Spring International Music Festival, Beijing International Music Festival, Hong Kong Art Festival, Macao International Music Festival, North Korea "April Spring" festival, and so on. It won numerous awards. Moreover, it bears the Shanghai Asiatisch-Pazifische Wirtschaftsgemeinschaft meeting and performed on the meeting for the world top 500.

14 October 1990
The orchestra held a special concert to celebrate the 100th anniversary at Carnegie Hall in New York. The US invited the orchestra to play. A hundred years ago, the first concert in Carnegie Hall was conducted by Tchaikovsky. A hundred years later, a symphony orchestra composed exclusively of Chinese musicians stepped on the stage for the first time and won acclaim from the 2300 audience members present. The next day SSO was deemed as "a world-class orchestra" by the New York Daily News.

20 June 2004
SSO held a concert for celebrating the 125 anniversary in the Berlin Philharmonie Hall. (It became the first Chinese orchestra perform in the Berlin Philharmonic Hall).

2010
SSO went to New York as the only Chinese symphony orchestra invited to give a concert in Central Park. The concert was in honor of Shanghai’s World Expo and the opening of a yearly series of symphonic concerts in Central Park. It signaled another intimate touch of Shanghai and the world.

September 2003
SSO held tour in eleven American cities.

2004
SSO had tour of Europe "Sino French culture year".

2012–2013 season
There were 55 artists "lined up" to cooperate with international orchestras. The "Beethoven World Records" series caught people’s eyes.

September 2014 
The Concert Hall of SSO will open to the public, bringing the orchestra to a new running model. It not only marks the realization of its dream crossing three centuries, but also represents an important step toward being a top orchestra in the world.

2020 
SSO performed the Liyue soundtrack for the video game Genshin Impact.

Long Yu

Long Yu is currently the conductor and Musical Director of the Shanghai Symphony Orchestra, the Artistic Director and Principal Conductor of China Philharmonic Orchestra, and the Music Director of the Guangzhou Symphony Orchestra, sharing his time between the three.  He is also the chairman of the Beijing International Music Festival Arts Council, and the Art committee of the Shanghai Oriental Art Center.
Jindong Cai of Stanford University said of Yu that he has "done a lot for the development of [European] classical music in China."

See also
 Huang Yijun
 List of symphony orchestras#China

References

China orchestras
Symphony orchestras
Musical groups established in 1879
1879 establishments in China
Culture in Shanghai